Howell John Davies (11 March 1885 – 2 July 1961) was a Welsh rugby union and professional rugby league footballer who played in the 1910s. He played representative level rugby union (RU) for Wales, and at club level for Pontypool RFC, as a hooker, i.e. number 2, and club level rugby league (RL) for Hunslet, as a forward (prior to the specialist positions of), during the era of contested scrums.

International honours
Howell Davies won caps for Wales (RU) while at Neath RFC in 1912 against England, and Scotland.

References

External links
Search for "Davies" at rugbyleagueproject.org

Statistics at scrum.com
Statistics at wru.co.uk

1885 births
1961 deaths
Footballers who switched code
Huddersfield Giants players
Neath RFC players
Rugby league forwards
Rugby league players from Neath Port Talbot
Rugby union hookers
Rugby union players from Skewen
Wales international rugby union players
Welsh rugby league players
Welsh rugby union players